The 2008–09 South Florida Bulls men's basketball team represented the University of South Florida Bulls in the 2008–09 NCAA Division I men's basketball season. This was the 4th season in the Big East Conference and was the 38th season in school history. The team is coached by Stan Heath in his second year at the school. USF played its home games in the USF Sun Dome. The Bulls finished the season 9–22, 4–14 in Big East play, and lost in the first round of the 2009 Big East men's basketball tournament in their first ever appearance.

Schedule and results

|-
!colspan=9| Exhibition

|-
!colspan=9| Regular Season

|-
!colspan=9| 2009 Big East men's basketball tournament

References

South Florida Bulls men's basketball seasons
South Florida Bulls
South Florida Bulls men's basketball team
South Florida Bulls men's basketball team